The Deronda Type F is an extreme performance, road going, track day car.  It has been designed and developed by professional motorsport engineers and utilises racing car technology.

When former airline executive, Andy Round, wanted to create the ultimate performance car he contracted Racing Designs Ltd, of Buckingham, and sister company Fabrication Techniques Ltd to design and build the Deronda Type F to meet his exacting specification.

Design features
Racing Designs boss, Mark Taylor, came up with an exoskeleton car featuring a space frame chassis with wishbone suspension at each corner and push-rod operated coil-over dampers. Audi's turbocharged 1800cc 4-cylinder engine is mounted longitudinally behind the cockpit to achieve the ultimate in weight distribution. The engine is mated with Audi's 5-speed transaxle gearbox, as used in the Audi A4 and Audi A6.

Production
The first prototype was completed in 2003 and was debuted at the Autosport International show in January 2004. This car was fitted with a Cosworth Technology tuned engine that produced 300BHP.
A second car was built, SVA tested and registered for use on the road. This car was later exported to the United States, where Sirius Motosports Inc have licensed the rights to the Deronda. Sirius Motorsports subsequently developed the Deronda Type G, which uses the GM LS2 V8 from the Chevrolet Corvette.
However, health problems prevented Andy from progressing with the Type F in the United Kingdom until April 2009 when an agreement was reached with Alternative Cars Ltd, manufacturer of Midas Cars.

Gallery

Related models
Deronda G400, slightly longer version with V-8 from a Chevrolet Corvette sold in the United States under this name.First Drive: Deronda G400 - A race-bred exotic sports car -2009

See also
Exoskeleton cars

External links 
 Deronda Cars Official Deronda UK Website
 Qdos Cars Deronda South-west distributor
 Midas Cars Midas Cars website

References

Cars of England
Kit car manufacturers